Jeffrey Ralph Cotton (born May 31, 1948) is an American rock guitarist, known for his work as a member of Captain Beefheart's Magic Band.  Cotton first came to attention as guitarist with Merrell and the Exiles, who had a few local hits in 1964 in the Los Angeles area. He subsequently joined Blues in a Bottle, which also featured future Magic Band members Mark Boston, Bill Harkleroad and John French. He was recruited into the Magic Band in 1967 as a replacement for Ry Cooder.

Cotton contributed unique and challenging slide guitar to live performances, Strictly Personal, Mirror Man and Trout Mask Replica; for which he was renamed Antennae Jimmy Semens.
He left the Magic Band in 1970 after being attacked by temporary drummer Jeff Burchell during a group "talk" and having ribs broken. But this was probably just the final straw, having experienced the reclusive 8 months of rehearsals for Trout Mask Replica during which Beefheart experimented on the group members with sleep deprivation, food deprivation, and physical violence in an attempt to break their mental state down.
He renewed his professional relationship with Merrell Fankhauser (of The Exiles) in a band called MU. Despite a critically acclaimed album there was no commercial success, and he retired from the music business in 1975 to study the Christian Ministry. In 1981, long after the group had disbanded, a second LP of unreleased MU material was issued.

In 2022 a 50 year recording hiatus ended with his first solo album, The Fantasy of Reality.

He has three children.

Discography

With Captain Beefheart & His Magic Band
 Strictly Personal (1968)
 Trout Mask Replica (1969)
 Mirror Man (1967, released 1971)

With MU
 MU (1971)
 The Last Album (1974, released 1981)
 Children of the Rainbow (1974, released 1985)

Solo
 The Fantasy of Reality (2022)

References

External links
Space Blues, an online biography

Living people
American rock guitarists
American male guitarists
1949 births
The Magic Band members
20th-century American guitarists